Artur Ihorovych Denchuk (born 3 April 1992) is a Ukrainian professional footballer who plays as a goalkeeper for Peremoha Dnipro on loan from Metalist Kharkiv.

International career
He played for different Ukrainian youth national teams.

References

External links 
 
 
FPL profile
Player's profile on club's official website

1992 births
Living people
Footballers from Kharkiv
Ukrainian footballers
Ukraine youth international footballers
Ukraine under-21 international footballers
Association football goalkeepers
FC Metalist Kharkiv players
PFC Sumy players
FC Helios Kharkiv players
FC Kramatorsk players
FC Peremoha Dnipro players
Ukrainian First League players
Ukrainian Second League players